Ankh-ef-en-Khonsu i (Egyptian: ꜥnḫ-f-n-ḫnsw), also known as Ankh-af-na-khonsu, was a priest of the Egyptian god Mentu who lived in Thebes during the 25th and 26th dynasty (c. 725 BCE). He was the son of Bes-en-Mut I and Ta-neshet. Among practitioners of the modern religion of Thelema, he is best known under the name of Ankh-af-na-khonsu, and as the dedicant of the Stele of Revealing, a wooden offering stela made to ensure his continued existence in the netherworld now located in the Egyptian Museum in Cairo.

Meaning of the name

Sr. Lutea, writing in The Scarlet Letter, explains some of the words in his name:
A translation of the name might be close to the following: Ankh is both a tool and a symbol meaning 'new life.' The hyphen af is always part of another word that lends exclamatory force. The word, na is generally used as a preposition, such as 'to, for, belonging to, through, or because.' Khonsu was the adopted son of Amun and Mut from the Theban triad. His name comes from a word meaning, 'to cross over' or 'wanderer' or 'he who traverses.' So, his entire name may be translated as 'the truth that has crossed over.

Lutea's interpretation is a free one that Egyptologists would tend to reject. A modern Egyptological approach would translate the name Ankh-ef-en-Khonsu (ꜥnḫ-f-n-ḫnsw) as "He lives for Khonsu"; the name is particularly common during the Third Intermediate and Late Periods.

The Stela of Ankh-ef-en-Khonsu

The Stela of Ankh-ef-en-Khonsu (Cairo A 9422 [formerly Bulaq 666])is a painted, wooden offering stele, discovered in 1858 at the mortuary temple of Hatshepsut at Dayr al-Bahri by François Auguste Ferdinand Mariette. According to one translation of the stela done in the Thelemic perspective, it says of him:

...has left the multitudes and rejoined those who are in the light, he has opened the dwelling place of the stars; now then, the deceased, Ankh-af-na-khonsu has gone forth by day in order to do everything that pleased him upon earth, among the living.

or by a 1982 analysis,

deliverer of those who are in the sunshine, open for him the netherworld; indeed the Osiris Ankh-ef-en-Khonsu shall go forth by day to do that which he desires, all, upon earth, among the living.

In Thelema
The Book of the Law (I,36) says:

My scribe Ankh-af-na-khonsu, the priest of the princes, shall not in one letter change this book; but lest there be folly, he shall comment thereupon by the wisdom of Ra-Hoor-Khu-it.

Based on this, Aleister Crowley used the "magical" name "Ankh-f-n-khonsu" (from the "Stele 666" translation prepared in 1904 for Crowley by Egyptologist Émile Brugsch) to sign "The Comment" of The Book of the Law, and also used it sometimes when referring to himself as the prophet of Thelema and the Aeon of Horus. Kenneth Grant wrote that "Crowley claimed to have been a re-embodiment of the magical current represented by the priesthood to which Ankh-af-na-Khonsu belonged".

Notes

Sources

Thelemapedia. (2004). Ankh-af-na-khonsu. Retrieved April 14, 2006.

References
Crowley, Aleister. The Book of the Law/Liber AL vel Legis. S. Weiser, 2004.

Further reading
Tau Apiryon (1998). The Kiblah.

Ancient Egyptian priests
People of the Twenty-fifth Dynasty of Egypt
Thelema
8th-century BC clergy